Mahallaka Naga was the King of Anuradhapura from the House of Lambakanna I. He ruled from 135 till 141 AD. He was preceded by his son-in-law, Gajabahu I and succeeded by his son, Bhatika Tissa. During his succession to the throne, the king was very old, and thus he was popularly known as Mahallaka Naga or Mahalu Naga.

External links
 Kings & Rulers of Sri Lanka
 Codrington's Short History of Ceylon

Year of birth missing
Year of death missing
Monarchs of Anuradhapura
Sinhalese kings
House of Lambakanna I
2nd-century Sinhalese monarchs